Boulah Ould Mogueye is a Mauritanian politician and diplomat.  He was the secretary general of the Republican Party for Democracy and Renewal and the former ambassador of the Islamic Republic of Mauritania to the Russian Federation, and current ambassador to Algeria.

See also 
 Ambassador of Mauritania to Russia

References 

Mauritanian diplomats
Year of birth missing (living people)
Living people
Ambassadors of Mauritania to Russia